Andrea Cesyl Macasaet (born March 13, 1994) is a Canadian actress and singer best known for her portrayal of Anne Boleyn in Six: The Musical.

Biography 
Macasaet was born on March 13, 1994, in Winnipeg, Manitoba. She is of Filipina descent. She grew up singing karaoke, which she still considers to be a central part of her family. She attended the Canadian College of Performing Arts. In the beginning on her career, she was part of K-Tel's Mini Pop Kids from 2004 to 2006 and stayed for at least 3 years and became widely known later of her performance in special guestings across Canada.

In 2019, Macasaet portrayed Anne Boleyn in Six: The Musical in at the Chicago Shakespeare Theatre. She continued the role through the productions at the American Repertory Theatre, Citadel Theatre, and Ordway Center for the Performing Arts. She was set to make her Broadway debut when the show moved to the Brooks Atkinson Theatre in 2020, but the COVID-19 pandemic shut down production. The show later opened the following year. Macasaet departed the show on 4 December 2022.

Theatre

References

1994 births
Living people
Actresses from Winnipeg
Canadian musical theatre actresses
Musicians from Winnipeg
21st-century Canadian actresses
21st-century Canadian women singers
Canadian actresses of Filipino descent
Canadian musicians of Filipino descent